Tennis at the 2015 Southeast Asian Games was held in Kallang Tennis Centre, in Kallang, Singapore from 6 to 14 June 2015.

Participating nations
A total of 68 athletes from nine nations is being competing in tennis at the 2015 Southeast Asian Games:

Medalists

Medal table

References

External links
  

 
Kallang